The Muntinlupa Mariners are a baseball team in the Baseball Philippines formed in 2007 as one of its charter members. The team was originally known as the Makati Mariners. The team moved to Muntinlupa in 2008.

Current roster
  Alvarez, Gilbert
  Angeles, Ruben, RP Team
  Aranzanzo, Meljon
  Aranzanzo, Probo
  Balazuela, Allan
  Batuto, Roel RP Team
  Borromeo, Andres
  Borromeo, Carlos
  Diego, Jerby
  Estanislao, Jerry
  Hidalgo, Wilfredo
  Icban, Larry
  Jasmin, Romeo
  Justo, Edito
  Manay, King
  Maniago, Rommel
  Mariano, Raymond
  Omandac, Hashim  RP Team
  Pantaleon, Melvin
  Peralta, Alvin
  Placides, Ramil
  Velasquez, Alejandro  RP Team
  Veloso, Jun

Tournament results

External links
 Baseball Philippines Official Site: Muntinlupa Mariners

Baseball teams established in 2007
Baseball Philippines
Baseball teams in the Philippines
Sports teams in Metro Manila